Daphne and Celeste are an American pop duo, consisting of Celeste Cruz and Karen 'Daphne' DiConcetto. Three of their singles reached the top 20 in the UK Singles Chart.

Success and album reaction
They released three singles in the UK: "Ooh Stick You", "U.G.L.Y." and a cover version of Alice Cooper's "School's Out". A full-length album, We Didn't Say That!, was released in June 2000 to generally mixed reviews (Melody Maker awarded it four out of five stars). Another single, "Party", was due in November 2000, but was never released.

During their performance at the Reading and Leeds Festivals in 2000, the crowd's negative reception towards Daphne and Celeste's incongruous music resulted in the duo being bottled by the audience. Despite the hostile crowd response, Daphne and Celeste remained on stage and continued to perform their songs though they left at the end of their second song in a three-song set due to the increasing crowd hostility.

"U.G.L.Y." was criticised by those who felt that it promoted bullying. Daphne and Celeste countered this by saying their lyrics were meant to be tongue-in-cheek. In an interview included on the "U.G.L.Y." single, Daphne stated: "Everyone is indeed ugly in their own special way." Daphne and Celeste made an appearance at Feet First. Daphne and Celeste also had a television and film deal.

Daphne and Celeste were eventually dropped by their label. Their official website closed down in October 2001, and their management company, Perfect Noise Limited, was dissolved in November 2002. After the band broke up Celeste went back to school.

Later activities
In a "Where Are They Now?" interview with Q magazine in 2005, Karen DiConcetto stated that the whole project was "100% manufactured", and that the girls auditioned for it in New York in 1998: "I just talked about shoes for an hour." She considered the Reading Festival to be the highlight of the whole experience, and mentioned her work in theatre afterwards, specifically a play called Tourrettaville, written by a boy with Tourette's syndrome. DiConcetto received positive reviews for her portrayal of "CB's Sister" in the FringeNYC award-winning Peanuts spoof Dog Sees God. That production was adapted for an Off-Broadway debut featuring a number of big-name celebrities, including Eliza Dushku and America Ferrera.

In the same interview, Celeste Cruz said that she had also worked in theatre and that the duo were planning to break into television. In 2004, Celeste also took the role of "Maria" in the movie Brooklyn Bound. In 2009 she appeared in an Emmy-nominated episode of 30 Rock entitled "Generalissimo". Celeste can also be found on Twitter. Unlike DiConcetto, she considered the Reading Festival incident the "end of the party for us".

Daphne and Celeste were also interviewed by Bad Horsey towards the end of 2005, with the questions coming from the B3ta web community. The interview was posted on the Estudio Caballito Malo website and featured in the Popbitch newsletter. An edited version was published in the January 2006 edition of the UK publication Fused Magazine.

DiConcetto has a role in Holger Ernst's The House Is Burning, which premiered at the 2006 Cannes Film Festival on 26 May. The film was produced by Wim Wenders, and is considered a German production, despite being filmed around New Jersey. In 2005, Daphne and Celeste had a mini reunion tour in the UK with Lolly. Celeste Cruz sang guest vocals on a song for Kent Odessa.

Reunion and recording
In 2011, English music producer Max Tundra contacted Daphne and Celeste through social media to offer his production to make a comeback. On 29 March 2015, the duo had a second reunion and released a single titled "You and I Alone", produced by Max Tundra. The song is the first single from the album Daphne & Celeste Save the World, and was written and produced by Max Tundra.

On 7 February 2018, Daphne and Celeste announced the comeback album with the launch of another song, "BB", produced by Max Tundra. The duo and Tundra performed at London's Boston Music Room to promote the release.

Discography

Studio albums

Singles

References

External links
Daphne and Celeste

American musical duos
American pop girl groups
Musical groups from New Jersey
Musical groups established in 1999
Musical groups disestablished in 2002
Musical groups reestablished in 2015
American dance music groups
1999 establishments in New Jersey